The Dassault Falcon 50 is a French super-midsize, long-range business jet, featuring a trijet layout with an S-duct air intake for the central engine. It has the same fuselage cross-section and similar capacity as the earlier twin-engined Falcon 20, but was a new design that is area ruled and includes a more advanced wing design.

Design and development

The first prototype flew on 7 November 1976, with French airworthiness certification on 27 February 1979, followed by U.S. Federal Aviation Administration certification on 7 March 1979. Dassault developed a maritime surveillance and environmental protection version as the Gardian 50.

The Falcon 50 was later updated as the Falcon 50EX, the first of which flew in 1996, and the last of which was delivered in 2008. The Falcon 50EX features improved engines and other enhancements to give further range improvements to an already long-range jet. The Falcon 50EX designation applies to serial numbers 253–352, which marks the end of the production line for the Falcon 50/50EX.

The last Falcon 50EX was built in late 2007 and delivered in early 2008.

Successors to the Falcon 50 are the Falcon 7X and the Falcon 900 featuring a larger fuselage and the same three-engine arrangement. Dassault announced in January 2008 what is essentially a replacement aircraft for the Falcon 50, codenamed the "SMS" (Super Mid Size). The basic design process, including engine selection, was supposed to be completed by early 2009. However, in a June 2009 press conference, CEO Charles Edelstenne said that all design choices had been reopened and the goal was extended to the end of the year.

Dassault and Aviation Partners Inc. have developed and certified High Mach blended winglets for the Falcon 50 & 50EX as a retrofit kit.

By 2018, Falcon 50s from the mid-late 1980s were priced at $0.879 to $1.6 million while 1998-2003 Falcon 50EXs can be had for $2.95 to $3.95 million.

Variants
Falcon 50
Basic initial variant with Honeywell TFE 731-3-1C engines and optional auxiliary power unit (APU); 252 manufactured, with one serving as a prototype for the Falcon 50EX.

Falcon 50EX
Marketing name for Falcon 50 with 3 DEEC (Digital Electronic Engine Control) controlled TFE 731-40 engines; an APU installed as standard equipment; changes to the rudder control system; updated avionics; and other improvements; 100 manufactured, plus one modified Falcon 50

Falcon 50 "Susanna"
Single Falcon 50 for Iraq modified with a Cyrano IV-C5 radar and hardpoints to carry two AM-39 Exocet antiship missiles. Used for training Mirage F1 crews and possibly carried out the attack on the USS Stark on May 17, 1987. This aircraft was flown to Iran during the Persian Gulf War and was not returned.

Operators

The majority of Falcon 50s are operated by corporate and individual owners.

Military and government operators

Accidents and incidents

Specifications (50EX)

See also

References

Bibliography
 Federal Aviation Administration Type Certificate Data Sheet No. A46EU, Revision 18: Dassault Aviation Mystere-Falcon 50, Mystere-Falcon 900, Falcon 900EX; August 17, 2016
 
 Taylor, John W. R. (editor). Jane's All the World's Aircraft 1988–89. Coulsdon, Surrey, UK: Jane's Information Group. .

External links

 Dassault Falcon 50 official website 
 Falcon 50 at Airliners.net
 Falcon 50 Winglet Modification

Falcon 0050
1970s French business aircraft
Low-wing aircraft
Trijets
Cruciform tail aircraft
Aircraft first flown in 1976